Almendral S.A. is a Chilean holding company established in 1981 that invests, or has invested, in the telecommunications, property, sanitation and healthcare sectors.
 
Almendral owns a controlling stake (54.8%) in Entel through its Altel Inversiones Ltda. subsidiary.  The stake represents 98% of Almendral's investment activity, although it also has minor holdings in the areas of housing and sanitation.

References 

Investment companies of Chile
1981 establishments in Chile